Open access to scholarly communication in Denmark has grown rapidly since the 1990s. As in other countries in general, open access publishing is less expensive than traditional, paper-based, pre-Internet publishing.

Repositories and platforms
There are a number of collections of scholarship in Denmark housed in digital open access repositories. They contain journal articles, book chapters, data, and other research outputs that are free to read. The consortial Scandinavian hprints repository began operating in 2008, specializing in arts, humanities, and social sciences content. In 2017, Aarhus University launched an open science platform, SPOMAN.

Policy
Leaders of the Copenhagen Business School voted in June 2009 to adopt an open access mandate, the first of its kind in Denmark.

In 2012 Denmark's main public funders of research began requiring that grantees deposit articles into open access digital repositories. In 2014, the Danish Ministry of Research created a national policy requiring open access for all publicly funded research published after 2020.

See also
 Nordbib, a funding programme to aid and develop open access initiatives within the academic field in the Nordic countries
 Publishing companies of Denmark
 Internet in Denmark
 Education in Denmark
 Media of Denmark
 Copyright law of the European Union
 Open access in other countries

References

Further reading
in English
 
 
 
 
  
 
  

in other languages

External links
 
 
 
 Open Knowledge Danmark, part of Open Knowledge International
 
 

Academia in Denmark
Communications in Denmark
Denmark
Science and technology in Denmark
Publishing in Denmark